Geoffrey Glascott Houghton Page (1929-2002), was a male rower who competed for England.

Rowing career
He represented England and won a silver medal in the eights and a bronze medal in the coxed fours at the 1954 British Empire and Commonwealth Games in Vancouver, Canada. He was a member of the University College London and Thames Rowing Club.

Coaching career
He coached at University College School, University College Dublin and Thames RC.

Personal life
Born April 4, 1929. Son of 'Freddie' (James H) Page. Married Patricia (Paddy) Page in 1951, 3 daughters. 
In 1965 he became a journalist for the Sunday Telegraph and then The Daily Telegraph.

References

1929 births
2002 deaths
English male rowers
Commonwealth Games medallists in rowing
Commonwealth Games silver medallists for England
Commonwealth Games bronze medallists for England
Rowers at the 1954 British Empire and Commonwealth Games
Medallists at the 1954 British Empire and Commonwealth Games